The Shooting events at the 2010 Commonwealth Games took place at the Dr. Karni Singh Shooting Range from 5 to 13 October 2010.

The Full Bore events were held at the CRPF Campus (Kadarpur) from 9 to 13 October 2010.

Medal table

Medals by events

Pistol

Men's events

Women's events

Small Bore and Air Rifle

Men's events

Women's events

Full Bore Rifle

Clay target

Men's events

Women's events

Participating nations

References
Official Site

 
2010
2010 Commonwealth Games events
Commonwealth Games
Shooting competitions in India